Legionella gratiana is a Gram-negative bacterium from the genus Legionella which was isolated from water in the Savoy region in France from a thermal spa.

References

External links
Type strain of Legionella gratiana at BacDive -  the Bacterial Diversity Metadatabase

Legionellales
Bacteria described in 1991